Jennifer Louise Houston (born 22 April 1971) is a former Australian politician of Palawa heritage. She represented Bass in the Tasmanian House of Assembly from 2018 to 2021 as a member of the Labor Party.

References

1971 births
Living people
Members of the Tasmanian House of Assembly
Australian Labor Party members of the Parliament of Tasmania
21st-century Australian politicians
Women members of the Tasmanian House of Assembly
Indigenous Australian politicians
21st-century Australian women politicians